The Canada Safety Council is a national, non-profit, charitable organization dedicated to safety. It works to prevent deaths and injuries by promoting education and awareness across Canada.

It provides marketing opportunities for its sponsors. 

During the COVID-19 pandemic, CSC received a $220,000 grant from the Public Health Agency of Canada's Immunization Partnership Fund for a project titled the “Elmer Vaccine Education and Awareness Program”. The resulting program, centred around a character named Elmer the Safety Elephant, was “delivered in schools with the support of teachers across Canada” to increase uptake of COVID-19 vaccines. It was endorsed by the Canadian Association of School System Administrators (CASSA), Canadian School Boards Association (CSBA) and Physical and Health Education Canada.

References

External links
Official website: English, French 
Gearing Up, www.ridertraining.org

Non-profit organizations based in Ottawa